Snoops is an American comedy-drama television series that aired on ABC from September 26 to December 19, 1999. Created by David E. Kelley, the show came about during the height of Kelley's fame, with both The Practice and Ally McBeal sustaining large audiences. Although the series garnered good ratings initially by averaging 11.5 million viewers, tying NBC in the ratings, it soon faltered and was cancelled quickly. Only ten of the thirteen episodes produced aired in the United States, while the final three episodes aired overseas. The final episode, which was rewritten by Kelley after the cancellation announcement, served as a series finale.

Synopsis
Snoops focuses on a less-than-conventional detective agency, Glenn Hall, Inc., headed by Glenn Hall (Gina Gershon). Her staff included Roberta Young (Paula Jai Parker), a detective who goes to great lengths to get the job done; Manny Lott (Danny Nucci), the resident technology wiz; and Dana Plant (Paula Marshall), a former Santa Monica police detective.

Cast

Main
 Gina Gershon as Glenn Hall
 Paula Marshall as Dana Plant (Episodes 1–11)
 Danny Nucci as Manny Lott
 Paula Jai Parker as Roberta Young
 Edward Kerr as Detective Greg McCormack
 Jessalyn Gilsig as Suzanne Shivers (Episodes 12 & 13)

Guest stars
 John Glover as Gary Hyndman
 Stephen Tobolowsky as Michael Bench
 Priscilla Barnes as Herself
 Casey Biggs as Gary Marlowe
 D. B. Woodside as Avery
 Emmy Rossum as Caroline Beels
 Denise Crosby as Evelyn Houtch
 David E. Kelley as Himself (cameo appearance)

Connection with other David E. Kelley's TV series 
After the series was canceled, the character of Glenn Hall would later appear in an episode of the final season of The Practice entitled "The Firm". Series creator David E. Kelley later cast Jessalyn Gilsig on his FOX series Boston Public, and also cast one-time Snoops guest star Emmy Rossum in a multi-episode arc of The Practice.

Episodes

Production
On December 16, 1998, David E. Kelley began production on the show, which was greenlighted by ABC. Principal photography began on August 15, 1999, in Los Angeles, California.

References

External links
  (archive)
 
 

1999 American television series debuts
1999 American television series endings
1990s American comedy-drama television series
American Broadcasting Company original programming
1990s American crime drama television series
English-language television shows
Television series by 20th Century Fox Television
Television series created by David E. Kelley
American detective television series
Television shows set in Los Angeles